Beaver Township is one of the fourteen townships of Mahoning County, Ohio, United States. The 2010 census found 6,711 people in the township.

Geography
Located in the southern part of the county, Beaver Township borders the following other townships:

Boardman Township - northeast
Springfield Township - east
Unity Township, Columbiana County - southeast corner
Fairfield Township, Columbiana County - south
Salem Township, Columbiana County - southwest corner
Green Township - west
Canfield Township - northwest

Part of the city of Columbiana is located in southern Beaver Township, and the unincorporated community of North Lima lies at the center of the township.

Name and history
Beaver Township was organized in 1811. For many years, the township was part of Columbiana County, before becoming part of Mahoning County in 1846.

Statewide, other Beaver Townships are located in Noble and Pike counties.

Government
The township is governed by a three-member board of trustees, who are elected in November of odd-numbered years to a four-year term beginning on the following January 1. Two are elected in the year after the presidential election and one is elected in the year before it. There is also an elected township fiscal officer, who serves a four-year term beginning on April 1 of the year after the election, which is held in November of the year before the presidential election. Vacancies in the fiscal officership or on the board of trustees are filled by the remaining trustees.  The trustees are Thaddeaus Lyda (chair), Ronald Kappler, and Larry Wehr, and Richard Lotze is the fiscal officer.  The township operates police and fire departments.

Transportation
The Youngstown Elser Metro Airport is located within Beaver Township.

Education
Most school age children residing in Beaver Township attend South Range Local School District. Its high school, middle school and elementary school are all located in a new (Fall 2010) complex in Beaver Township.

References

Further reading
Butler, Joseph Green, Youngstown and The Mahoning Valley, Ohio; 1921, American Historical Society, Chicago and New York.

External links
Township website
Mahoning County website

Townships in Mahoning County, Ohio
1811 establishments in Ohio
Populated places established in 1811
Townships in Ohio